Jesper Hansen (born 24 December 1963) is a Danish former football player (goalkeeper) and now manager.

As player he played for Holbæk B&I, Jyderup Boldklub, Brøndby IF and Brønshøj Boldklub. He played a total 40 games for Brøndby in all competitions. Hansen played one game for the Denmark national under-21 football team in November 1983.

He has formerly managed Brønshøj Boldklub, Holbæk B&I, Herfølge Boldklub, Hellerup IK, Lolland-Falster Alliancen. and Greve Fodbold

References 

1963 births
Living people
Danish men's footballers
Denmark under-21 international footballers
Brøndby IF players
Brønshøj Boldklub players
Brønshøj BK managers
Danish football managers
Holbæk B&I managers
Herfølge Boldklub managers
Association football goalkeepers
Holbæk B&I players